Leyton Midland Road is a London Overground station in Leyton of the London Borough of Waltham Forest. It is the closest railway station to Bakers Arms.

History
The station opened on 9 July 1894 as part of the Tottenham and Forest Gate Railway and was originally called "Leyton".

On 17 August 1915, three explosive bombs from the German Zeppelin L.10 landed on or near the station, destroying the ticket office and a billiard hall in the arches under the platform and damaging several houses nearby. Four people were killed.

The station was renamed Leyton Midland Road on 1 May 1949. The goods yard, which was just beyond the station, closed on 6 May 1968. As with Leytonstone High Road and Wanstead Park stations, the booking office was built into the viaduct arch. By the 1980s all the old buildings had been removed and the Greater London Council built a new booking office on Midland Road itself. A few years later that was closed and demolished when, like other stations, Leyton Midland Road became unstaffed.

Station today
Since the takeover by London Overground the station has benefited from a major refit including deep clean, new signing, a ticket machine and additional waiting shelters. The community garden which was started by members of the GOBLIN support group is tended by station staff now, one of whom recently won an award for outstanding service to passengers. The station also contains help points and automatic ticket gates have now been installed. Controversially, the Midland Road entrance is now closed.

Services and connections
The service has been improved in stages to four trains per hour, weekdays and weekends except late evenings when it goes down to two trains per hour.

London Bus routes 69, 97 and W16 and night route N26 serve the station.

Recent proposals
In common with other stations on the line, usage has greatly increased in recent years, following improvements in train services and the reintroduction of station staff, and peak-hour overcrowding of the two-car diesel trains is now a major issue. Electrification of the line was finally approved after a long campaign and was achieved for 2017. Services from the station were suspended for 8 months (June 2016 – February 2017) whilst the work was carried out.

References

External links

Railway stations in the London Borough of Waltham Forest
DfT Category E stations 
Former Tottenham and Forest Gate Railway stations
Railway stations in Great Britain opened in 1894
Railway stations served by London Overground
Leyton